Waldemar Vianna da Silveira (9 March 1916 – 10 March 2001) was a Brazilian weightlifter. He competed in the men's heavyweight event at the 1952 Summer Olympics.

References

External links
  

1916 births
2001 deaths
Brazilian male weightlifters
Olympic weightlifters of Brazil
Weightlifters at the 1952 Summer Olympics
Place of birth missing